Robert Bertrand France (October 8, 1960 – February 15, 2015) was a Jamaica-born American computer scientist. 

Robert B. France was born in Jamaica on October 8, 1960, the eldest son of Robert W. and Jeanette France. He attended high school in Guyana and studied for a BSc degree in Natural Sciences at the University of the West Indies in Saint Augustine, Trinidad and Tobago, majoring in Computer Science and Mathematics and receiving a first class degree in 1984. He then attended Massey University in New Zealand funded by a Commonwealth Scholarship, where he achieved a PhD degree in computer science in 1990. During the same year, he married Sheriffa R. Soleyn in Saint Vincent. They emigrated to the United States together and in due course moved to Fort Collins, Colorado.

During 1990–92, France was a postdoctoral research associate at the Institute for Advanced Computer Studies, University of Maryland. From 1992 to 1997, he was an assistant professor in the computer science and engineering department at Florida Atlantic University (FAU), becoming tenured in 1997–98. France was then appointed an associate professor from 1998 until 2004 and then full professor at Colorado State University within the department of computer science. He undertook research on model-driven software development, especially concerning formal software modeling languages and associated analysis tools. He was co-founder and editor-in-chief of the Software and Systems Modeling journal from 1999 until 2015.

In 2008, Robert France and his co-authors Andy Evans, Kevin Lano, and Bernhard Rumpe, were awarded the Ten Year Most Influential Paper Award at the MODELS 2008 Conference on Model Driven Engineering Languages and Systems for the 1998 paper "The UML as a Formal Modeling Notation". In 2013, France was awarded a five-year International Chair at INRIA in France. He was awarded a senior Dahl–Nygaard Prize for his research by the Association Internationale pour les Technologies Objets (AITO) in 2014. In the same year, he was awarded a Colorado State University, College of Natural Sciences Professor Laureate and an Excellence in Science and Technology Award from the Institute of Caribbean Studies.

Robert France died on February 15, 2015. He had a son and daughter with his wife, Sheriffa.

Selected publications

References

External links
 Robert France home page
 Robert France on ResearchGate
 Dr. Robert France, Professor, Computer Science, Colorado State University on Vimeo
 Robert B. France on DBLP
 
 

1960 births
2015 deaths
University of the West Indies alumni
Massey University alumni
Jamaican expatriates in the United States
American computer scientists
Formal methods people
Software engineering researchers
Academic journal editors
Florida Atlantic University faculty
Colorado State University faculty